Carolyn Jones is an American director, writer, producer, photographer and speaker. She is best known for her 1997 book publication Living Proof: Courage in the Face of AIDS, her 2014 documentary The American Nurse, and her 2017 documentary Defining Hope. She is co-founder of the non-profit 100 People Foundation. Her television appearances include PBS NewsHour, WNET's MetroFocus, and Katie Couric's show Katie.

Filmography 
 Living Proof: HIV and the Pursuit of Happiness (co-writer) (1994)
 The American Nurse (2014)
 Defining Hope (2017)
 In Case of Emergency (2020)

Books 
 Living Proof: Courage in the face of AIDS (1997)
 The Family of Women: Voices Across the Generations (1999)
 Every Girl Tells A Story (2002)
 The American Nurse: Photographs and Interviews by Carolyn Jones (2012)

References

External links

1957 births
Living people
American documentary filmmakers
American photographers